Pierre Langlois (1909–1990) was a French philatelist who joined the Roll of Distinguished Philatelists in 1967.

Langlois was a chemist by profession.

References

External links
http://www.academiedephilatelie.org/memorialtitulaires.html
Photograph of Pierre Langlois

French philatelists
1909 births
1990 deaths
Fellows of the Royal Philatelic Society London
Signatories to the Roll of Distinguished Philatelists